Boys Boys Boys or variation may refer to :

 "Boys Boys Boys", a 2008 song by Lady Gaga, from the album The Fame
 "Boys Boys Boys", an alternative title of the 1987 song "Boys (Summertime Love)", by Sabrina Salerno
 "Boys Boys Boys", a 2016 song by Grace, from the album FMA
 Boys, Boys, Boys (1964 album), pop rock album by Lesley Gore

See also

 Boy, Boy, Boy (song), a song by Underworld from the 2007 album Oblivion with Bells
 "Oh boy, oh boy, oh boy!", a 1946 song written by Lasse Dahlquist
 Boyboy (disambiguation)
 Boys (disambiguation)
 Boy (disambiguation)